The Left is a political alliance in Poland. Initially founded to contest the 2019 parliamentary election, the alliance now consists of the New Left and Left Together.

It also originally consisted of Democratic Left Alliance and Spring until its merging to create the New Left, including the Polish Socialist Party that left the coalition in 2021. It is also supported by several minor left-wing parties including Your Movement, Yes for Łódź, Urban Movement, and the Polish Communist Party.

The Left is a catch-all coalition of the Polish left, and it is positioned on the centre-left and left-wing. It is mainly orientated towards the principles of social democracy, and democratic socialism. It also advocates progressive, social-liberal and secular policies, including LGBT rights. It is supportive of Poland's membership in the European Union.

Voter base
As Lewica is formed as a unification of the Polish left, it has attempted to diversify its platform and appeal to a broader range of voters, rather than relying mostly on the votes of former officials and civil servants during the PPR period, which had been and continues to be one of the Democratic Left Alliance's largest voting blocs. This attempt, however, was met with somewhat limited success by the fact that the coalition's pro-LGBT rights platform failed to appeal to working class and economically left-leaning Poles, which tend to favour a more socially conservative policy (especially as both economically interventionist and social conservative positions were already being provided by the right-wing PiS party). At the same time, the more liberally-oriented city-dwelling population, which could favour the party's proposed socially progressive policies, found little appeal in the party's platform of economic interventionism.

Despite this, some sociologists theorized that the unification of the parties could lead to an overall mobilization of leftist voters, which could now feel that their vote for the coalition wouldn't be wasted. This was confirmed to be the case when Lewica succeeded in electing 49 members to the Sejm and 2 members to the Senate of Poland in the 2019 Polish parliamentary election, thus making the coalition Poland's third largest political force and overturning a four-year absence of left-wing representatives in Poland's parliament.

In addition, the party's platform, which differs greatly from the platforms of the other major Polish political parties, has managed to find some support among disillusioned younger and secular voters, which don't identify with any political force or even with the left, but instead desire "something new".

At the same time, the party also received a considerable boost in support among older voters after the ruling PiS party passed a "degradation law", which cut retirement pensions and disability benefits for thousands of former bureaucrats during the PPR period, whose main income was now directly threatened by the new government policy. This led to an expansion and consolidation of the otherwise shrinking of the Democratic Left Alliance's previously described voting bloc.

Ideology
The electoral program of the Left includes:
investments in renewable energy sources and energy efficiency,
rewilding, including reforestation and restoration of wetlands,
appointment of the Commissioner for Animal Rights, prohibition of fur farming, use of animals in circuses and cage farming,
universal national crop insurance against drought and flooding,
cameras on police uniforms recording in continuous mode,
moving 1/4 of ministries and government agencies outside Warsaw,
abolishing the Institute of National Remembrance and the National Day of Remembrance of the "cursed soldiers",
increasing R&D expenditure to 2% of GDP,
sick leave pay and sickness benefit amounting to 100% of the basic salary plus bonuses and allowances,
establishing a minimum wage at 60% of the average wage,
minimum wage of 3500 PLN in the public sector,
widening the competences of the National Labour Inspectorate,
a maximum fee for a prescription drug of 5 PLN,
increasing public healthcare expenditure to 7.2% of GDP in 2024,
introducing health and sex education in schools,
extinguishing the reprivatization claims,
establishing a public enterprise to provide one million flats in the years 2021–2031,
in vitro fertilization reimbursement,
fully paid and compulsory leave with a minimum of 12 weeks for both parents of a newborn,
transparency of church funding and abolishing the Church Fund,
Separation of church and state
liberalising Poland's abortion law,
gender quotas in the Council of Ministers,
introducing same-sex marriage and civil partnerships.

Composition

Current members

Electoral performance

Sejm

Senate

Presidential

References

2019 establishments in Poland
Democratic Left Alliance
Left Together
Political parties established in 2019
Political party alliances in Poland
Pro-European political parties in Poland
Secularism in Poland
Spring (political party)